Legends & Lies is an American television series shown on Fox News Channel. Its executive producer is Bill O'Reilly.

The show's premise is to present the history of notable people in documentary style, debunking inaccurate details that have entered pop culture mythology. The series features dramatizations of parts of the subjects' lives and exploits, as well as explanatory segments by historians and experts, and often O'Reilly himself.

The show premiered in April 2015. Its normal broadcast schedule is on Saturday and Sunday nights. Each season of the series also features an accompanying book co-authored by David Fisher and O'Reilly. Season 3 had its finale on June 10, 2018.

Episodes

Season 1 (2015)
The first season focused on the figures from the American Old West.

Season 2 (2016)
The second season is about the heroes and patriots who helped shape America into a nation.

Season 3 (2018)
The third season is about the American Civil War.

Production
One of the locations used for filming the second season was Old Salem in Winston-Salem, North Carolina.

Reception
The premiere-weekend episodes, run back to back on Sunday, April 12, 2015, beat all other cable-news programs in its time slot and for the night overall in the Nielsen ratings.

References

External links
 Official page at FoxNews.com

Fox News original programming
2015 American television series debuts
2018 American television series endings
2010s American drama television series
Television series about the history of the United States
Bill O'Reilly (political commentator)
Historical television series
Period television series
Serial drama television series
Television series based on actual events
Television series about the American Revolution
Television series set in the 18th century
Television series set in the 19th century
English-language television shows